Fairchild Peak is a conspicuous rock peak,  high, standing  south-southeast of Portal Rock, at the south side of the mouth of Tillite Glacier. It was named by the Advisory Committee on Antarctic Names for William W. Fairchild, a United States Antarctic Research Program cosmic ray scientist at McMurdo Sound, 1961.

References 

Mountains of the Ross Dependency
Shackleton Coast